Roshchino is a rural locality (a settlement) in Valuysky District, Belgorod Oblast, Russia. The population was 66 as of 2010. There are 4 streets.

Geography 
Roshchino is located 21 km southeast of Valuyki (the district's administrative centre) by road. Nekhayevka is the nearest rural locality.

References 

Rural localities in Valuysky District

Renamed localities of Belgorod Oblast